The following electric streetcar lines once operated in Staten Island, New York, United States. The first trip was on July 4, 1892, and the last was on January 26, 1934. The streetcar lines were mostly preceded by horse-car lines, and have generally been superseded by MTA Staten Island bus routes.

Richmond Light and Railroad Company
The Richmond Light and Railroad Company (previously named Staten Island Electric Railroad, later Richmond Railways) operated a system in northeastern Staten Island.

Staten Island Midland Railway
The Staten Island Midland Railway (previously Midland Electric Railroad) operated in central Staten Island, and was continued by city-operated streetcars and trolleybuses during 1920–1927.

See also
 Staten Island Railway
 List of streetcar lines in the Bronx
 List of streetcar lines in Brooklyn
 List of streetcar lines in Manhattan
 List of streetcar lines in Queens
 List of streetcar systems in the United States

Notes

External links
 
 
 

 
Staten
Streetcar